Marros-Pendine Coast is a Site of Special Scientific Interest in Carmarthen & Dinefwr, Wales. It includes Marros Sands, Morfabychan beach and part of Pendine Sands and some of the cliffs and slopes above them.
The SSSI was designated in 1988 and has an area of 2.5 km2.

See also
List of Sites of Special Scientific Interest in Carmarthen & Dinefwr

References

Sites of Special Scientific Interest in Carmarthen & Dinefwr
Coast of Carmarthenshire